François-Claudius Compte-Calix (1813–1880) was a French painter of genre subjects and portraits. He was born in Lyons and studied in the fine art school of his native city, and in the studio of J. C. Bonnefond. He first exhibited at the Paris Salon in 1840. His Vieil Ami, painted in 1863, was in the International Exhibition at Paris in 1867. He died at Chazay d'Azergues near Lyons in 1880.

References
 

1813 births
1880 deaths
19th-century French painters
French male painters
Artists from Lyon
19th-century French male artists